Blairadam railway station is a disused station in Fife, Scotland which was open from 1860 to 1964 on the Kinross-shire Railway.

History 
The station opened on 20 June 1860 by the North British Railway. To the southwest were sidings and to the south of the northbound platform was the signal box. The station closed on 22 September 1930. The signal box closed in 1957. It closed to goods on 23 March 1964.

References

External links 

Disused railway stations in Fife
Former North British Railway stations
Railway stations in Great Britain opened in 1860
Railway stations in Great Britain closed in 1930
1860 establishments in Scotland
1930 disestablishments in Scotland